During the 1994–95 Italian football season, Brescia Calcio competed in the Serie A and their first season in the top flight since the 1992–93 season.

Summary
They also accumulated the league's lowest points total since the introduction of 3 points for a win with just 12 points, as well as the record for the second fewest wins in a Serie A season with just 2 victory in 34 games after Varese with 1 win in 1971–72 season. The season marked the debut match for 
future world-champion and multiple Serie A winner Andrea Pirlo.

Squad

Competitions

Serie A

League table

Matches

Source:RSSSF

Coppa Italia

Second round

Statistics

Squad statistics

References

1994–95
Brescia